Irefi is one of the four villages in Oraifite in Ekwusigo Local Government Area of Anambra State of Nigeria.  Others are Unodu, Ezumeri, and Ifite. Nkwo-Edo market is situated there.

Notable people
 Azuka Okwuosa – former Anambra State Commissioner for Works and Transport

References

Populated places in Anambra State